The Leyte Progressive High School is a private and non-sectarian academic institution. It is the oldest existing Chinese school in Tacloban City. It is colloquially known as Heng-hwa by the local Chinese Filipino community.

History

In 1919, the Leyte Chinese School was established by a group of local Chinese businessmen through the Leyte Tek Club and the Tacloban Filipino-Chinese Chamber of Commerce.

The Leyte Chinese School started in an old building with two rooms and with an enrolment of a few boys and girls who were mostly from the Leyte Chinese Community. The school was registered with the Department of Education in 1921. Eight years after its establishment, the first school building was erected.

Three years after, the first newly built Chinese School in Leyte was closed for a year due to financial problems.

The school's closure alarmed the Chinese community; hence, an education committee was organized with the objective of reopening the school in line with its vision that education of the Chinese children should be given concerted and preferential attention by the Chinese community.

As expected, the student population increased and the school was transferred to a building at Grand Capitan street (now Justice Romualdez Street).

The school was forced to close when war broke out in 1941 and was reopened after the liberation in October 1945.

The Chinese community immediately worked on the renovation of the school buildings and other facilities which had been destroyed by the war. A new school building was constructed at Sabang District. Thus, the first graduation ceremony for the High School department was held in the new building.

At this point, the name was changed from Leyte Chinese School to Leyte Chinese High School.

However, in 1973, a government circular required all Chinese schools to Filipinize their names so that it had to be renamed Leyte Progressive High School.

Academic programs

 Pre-Nursery (for toddlers age 2–3 years old)
 Nursery (for ages 3–4 years old)
 Kindergarten I
 Kindergarten II
 Complete Elementary Grades 1 to 6
 Complete High School Grades 7 to 12
 Chinese Curriculum (Chinese Studies)
 Special Class for transferees/new enrollees who would take Chinese on the following year

Alumni association
The Leyte Progressive High School Alumni Association or LPHSAA is an organization of concerned alumni of Leyte Progressive High School. There is also a Manila Chapter.

References 

 http://lphs-ssg.wix.com/home#!history
 https://www.edukasyon.ph/schools/leyte-progressive-high-school
 https://www.yellow-pages.ph/business/leyte-progressive-high-school-2

High schools in Leyte (province)
Schools in Tacloban
Educational institutions established in 1921
Chinese-language schools in the Philippines
1921 establishments in the Philippines